is a 2015 Japanese historical drama film directed by Masato Harada. It was released on August 8, 2015.

A remake of Japan's Longest Day (1967), the film depicts the chain of command of Imperial Japan's government, military, and War Council under Hirohito in the immediate period before the surrender of Japan in World War II between April 1945 to August 15, 1945, chronicling Kantarō Suzuki's term as the Prime Minister and the final months of War Minister Korechika Anami, the Allied firebombing of Tokyo on May 25, preparations for Operation Ketsugō, the leadership's response to the Potsdam Declaration and the atomic bombings of Hiroshima and Nagasaki, and the failed military coup intended to foil Japan's declaration of surrender.

Plot 
The film recreates the chain of historical events from April to August 15, 1945, which determined the further fate of Japan: the last months of the command of the armed forces of Imperial Japan and the military council under the leadership of Hirohito in the period before Japan's surrender in World War II, the tenure of Kantaro Suzuki as prime minister and the last months of his tenure as Minister of War Korechika Anami, the Allied bombing of Tokyo, preparations for Operation  Ketsugō, the reaction of the leadership to the Potsdam Declaration and the atomic bombings of Hiroshima and Nagasaki, as well as a failed military coup designed to thwart Japan's surrender.

Cast
Kōji Yakusho as General Korechika Anami
Masahiro Motoki as Emperor Hirohito
Tori Matsuzaka as Major Kenji Hatanaka
Kenichi Yajima as Naidaijin Kōichi Kido
Akaji Maro as Admiral Hisanori Fujita
Ikuji Nakamura as Admiral Mitsumasa Yonai
Kazuhiro Yamaji as Tōji Yasui
Yuki Ikenobō as Empress Kōjun
Shu Nakajima as General Hideki Tojo
Yasumasa Oba as Lieutenant Colonel Masataka Ida
Misako Renbutsu as Kimiko
Erika Toda (special appearance as Miss Yasuki)
Kenichi Matsuyama (special appearance as Takeo Sasaki)
Shinichi Tsutsumi as Chief Secretary Hisatsune Sakomizu
Tsutomu Yamazaki as Prime Minister Kantarō Suzuki

Reception
The film grossed  on its opening weekend and was number 10 at the box office. It had grossed  by August 26. The film received ten Japan Academy Film Prize nominations, as well as the Blue Ribbon Award and Mainichi Film Awards.

See also
Japan's Longest Day (1967)

References

External links
 

2010s historical drama films
Japanese historical drama films
World War II films based on actual events
Films directed by Masato Harada
Films set in 1945
Pacific War films
Cultural depictions of Hirohito
2015 drama films
2015 films
Films about armies
2010s Japanese films